John Jay High School may refer to:

In New York
John Jay High School (Cross River, New York), in Westchester County
John Jay High School (Hopewell Junction, New York), in Dutchess County
John Jay Educational Campus (Brooklyn), formerly the location of John Jay High School

In Texas
John Jay High School (San Antonio)